Andrew Saul Levin (born August 10, 1960) is an American attorney and politician who served as the U.S. representative for  from 2019 to 2023. A member of the Democratic Party, Levin was elected to the House in 2018, succeeding his retiring father, Sander Levin. He is the nephew of Carl Levin, a former U.S. senator.

Early life and education
Levin was born on August 10, 1960, to parents Sander Levin and Vicki Schlafer. Sander was elected to the United States House of Representatives in 1982. Andy grew up with two sisters, Jennifer and Madeleine, and a brother, Matthew.

Levin graduated from Williams College with a bachelor's degree. He earned a master's degree in Asian languages and culture from the University of Michigan and a Juris Doctor from Harvard Law School.

Early career
Levin was a staff attorney for the U.S. Commission on the Future of Worker-Management Relations in 1994 and worked as a trade union organizer and director. He ran as a Democrat for the 13th district seat in the Michigan State Senate in 2006. He lost to Republican John Pappageorge by 0.6% of the vote. After the election, he directed Voice@Work, a program seeking to expand trade union membership.

In 2007, Governor Jennifer Granholm appointed Levin deputy director in the Michigan Department of Energy, Labor, and Economic Growth (DELEG). He oversaw the "No Worker Left Behind" program, which provided job training to unemployed workers. In 2009, Granholm named him chief workforce officer. In 2010, Granholm named him acting director of DELEG, a role he served in until the end of her administration in 2011. He founded the clean energy firm Levin Energy Partners LLC and serves as president of Lean & Green Michigan.

U.S. House of Representatives

Elections

2018 

He defeated former State Representative Ellen Lipton and attorney Martin Brook in the primary election with 52.5% of the vote. Levin defeated Republican businesswoman Candius Stearns in the general election.

2020 

Levin ran for a second term in 2020. He defeated Republican Charles Langworthy and several minor candidates, with 57.8% of the vote.

2022 

In the 2022 Democratic primary, Levin lost to fellow incumbent Democrat Haley Stevens. As a result of redistricting, Michigan lost a seat in the House of Representatives, resulting in Stevens' and Levin's districts being combined, though the resulting district contained more of Stevens' original voters.
A Zionist and former synagogue leader known for his critical views of hard-line Israeli policies, Levin was opposed by the American Israel Public Affairs Committee (AIPAC), which provided $4 million for a negative publicity campaign against his candidacy. Levin has said, "AIPAC can’t stand the idea that I am the clearest, strongest Jewish voice in Congress standing for a simple proposition: that there is no way to have a secure, democratic homeland for the Jewish people unless we achieve the political and human rights of the Palestinian people."

Tenure

In November 2020, The New York Times reported rumors that Levin was considered a possible candidate for Secretary of Labor in the Biden administration; Mayor of Boston Marty Walsh was ultimately named to the post in 2021.

Committee assignments
Committee on Education and Labor (Vice Chair)
 Subcommittee on Health, Employment, Labor, and Pensions
 Subcommittee on Higher Education and Workforce Investment
 Committee on Foreign Affairs
 Subcommittee on Asia, the Pacific and Nonproliferation
 Subcommittee on the Western Hemisphere, Civilian Security and Trade

Caucus memberships 
 Congressional Progressive Caucus (Deputy Whip)
Medicare for All Caucus
 House Pro-Choice Caucus

Electoral history

Personal life
Levin and his wife Mary (née Freeman) have four children, and live in Bloomfield Township. Levin is Jewish.

See also
2022 United States House of Representatives elections in Michigan
List of Jewish members of the United States Congress

References

External links

|-

1960 births
21st-century American Jews
21st-century American politicians
American Jews from Michigan
Democratic Party members of the United States House of Representatives from Michigan
Harvard Law School alumni
Jewish members of the United States House of Representatives
Jewish American people in Michigan politics
Levin family
Living people
Michigan lawyers
University of Michigan alumni
Williams College alumni